NCAA Division I independent schools are four-year institutions that compete in college athletics at the NCAA Division I level, but do not belong to an established athletic conference for a particular sport. These schools may however still compete as members of an athletic conference in other sports. A school may also be fully independent, and not belong to any athletic conference for any sport at all. The reason for independent status varies among institutions, but it is frequently because the school's primary athletic conference does not sponsor a particular sport.

Full independents
Two schools are competing as full independents for the 2022–23 season. Chicago State left the WAC at the conclusion of the 2021–22 school year without announcing a new conference affiliation for the next season, and has yet to announce plans to join any conferences for any subsequent seasons. Hartford started a transition from Division I to Division III in 2021–22, and left the America East Conference at the end of that school year. It is playing its final D-I season as a full independent for 2022–23 as it continues its transition to D-III before joining the Commonwealth Coast Conference in July 2023.

Three Chicago State teams have conference homes in the 2022–23 school year—men's soccer in the Mid-American Conference, and men's and women's tennis in the Horizon League.

Hartford is maintaining its single-sport golf memberships in the Big Sky Conference (men) and Metro Atlantic Athletic Conference (women) in 2022–23 before moving to the CCC. It will have to find a D-III conference home for its women's golf team because the CCC sponsors that sport only for men.

Current members

Sponsored Sports

Bowling
Bowling, like beach volleyball, is currently a women-only sport at the NCAA level that holds a single national championship open to all NCAA members. As of the 2022–23 season, six bowling programs are expected to compete as independents.

Field hockey
As of the most recently completed 2022 season, three schools are Division I independents in field hockey, with one being a full D-I member and the other two transitional D-I members. The full D-I member, James Madison, had competed in the Colonial Athletic Association in all sports, including field hockey, but moved to the Sun Belt Conference (SBC) in July 2022. However, since the SBC does not sponsor field hockey, the Dukes will compete as an independent in that sport only. JMU is one of three SBC members to sponsor the sport, the others being Appalachian State and Old Dominion (the latter of which joined the SBC alongside JMU). Those schools respectively play field hockey in the Mid-American Conference and Big East Conference.

The transitional D-I independents are Lindenwood and Queens (in North Carolina; not to be confused with Queens College in New York City, which remains in D-II), both of which started their transitions from NCAA Division II in July 2022. Unlike Stonehill, the other field hockey school that started a transition from D-II at the same time, Lindenwood and Queens joined conferences that do not sponsor the sport, respectively the Ohio Valley Conference and ASUN Conference. (Stonehill joined the field hockey-sponsoring Northeast Conference.) Neither Lindenwood nor Queens has announced a future field hockey affiliation.

Football

Football Bowl Subdivision

As of the most recent 2022 college football season, seven NCAA Division I FBS schools were football independents. Three of these schools, highlighted in pink, will join FBS conferences in 2023: BYU will move to the Big 12 Conference, while Liberty and New Mexico State will join Conference USA.

Notes

Ice hockey

Men
There are currently six NCAA Division I independents in men's ice hockey—the University of Alaska Fairbanks (branded athletically as simply "Alaska"), the University of Alaska Anchorage, Arizona State University, Lindenwood University, Long Island University (LIU), and Stonehill College.

Alaska became a men's independent after the 2020–21 season due to the demise of its former league, the men's side of the Western Collegiate Hockey Association (the WCHA remains in operation as a women-only league). The seven Midwestern members of the men's WCHA left to reestablish the Central Collegiate Hockey Association without the WCHA's three geographic outliers—the two Alaska schools, along with Alabama–Huntsville. Of these three schools, Alaska was the only one that did not initially drop hockey.

Alaska-Anchorage's hockey program was suspended in 2020 by the University of Alaska System due to a reduction in state funding, along with the skiing and gymnastics programs. The 2020-21 season was set to be its last, but due to the COVID-19 pandemic, they did not end up playing that season either. The Alaska Board of Regents told the hockey program they would be reinstated if they were able to collect 3 million dollars in donations and fundraising, so the team was on hiatus for both the 2020–21 and 2021-22 season while its future was uncertain. Ultimately, the money was raised, and the Seawolves were reinstated for the 2022-23 season, but due to the WCHAs aforementioned disbanding, they resumed play as an independent alongside the Nanooks.

Arizona State moved up from club hockey in the ACHA to full varsity status. The Sun Devils began playing a full Division I schedule in 2016–17, and expected to be in a hockey conference for 2017–18, but no conference move has yet materialized. With the  2020–21 season dramatically impacted by COVID-19, ASU entered into a scheduling agreement with the Big Ten Conference for that season, with the Sun Devils playing a road-only schedule of four games against each of the seven Big Ten hockey members.

LIU announced in late April 2020 that it would launch varsity men's hockey for the 2020–21 season. The Sharks have yet to announce a conference home, but played their first season as a scheduling partner of Atlantic Hockey.

In 2021–22, Lindenwood fielded two separate men's club teams, each playing at a different level of the American Collegiate Hockey Association (ACHA), which governs the sport at club level. On March 23, 2022, Lindenwood announced that it would launch a Division I men's varsity program starting in the 2022–23 season, while maintaining its ACHA program. This announcement came shortly after the school announced it was starting a transition from Division II to Division I in July 2022, joining the non-hockey Ohio Valley Conference.

On April 5, 2022, Stonehill, then a member of the D-II Northeast-10 Conference (NE-10), announced it was joining the Northeast Conference (which also does not sponsor ice hockey) that July, starting its own transition to D-I. Before this announcement, Stonehill had been one of seven NE-10 members that played men's ice hockey under Division II regulations, despite the NCAA not sponsoring a championship event at that level. (All other D-II schools with varsity men's ice hockey play under D-I regulations.)

Neither Lindenwood nor Stonehill has announced a conference home for its men's hockey program.

Lacrosse

Women's 
In the 2023 season (2022–23 school year), four schools will compete as independents—full independent Hartford, plus San Diego State, UC Davis, and Xavier.

San Diego State and UC Davis became independents after the 2021 season when their former women's lacrosse home of the Mountain Pacific Sports Federation shut down its league due to a lack of sponsoring members. Both will join the Pac-12 Conference for women's lacrosse after the 2023 season. Xavier starts varsity play in 2023, and will begin full conference play in its full-time home of the Big East Conference in 2024.

Soccer

Men
In addition to full independent Hartford, one school was independent in the most recently completed 2022 men's soccer season: the University of the Incarnate Word (UIW). It had initially announced its departure from the Southland Conference (SLC) for the Western Athletic Conference (WAC), where it had previously housed men's soccer. However, days before its move to the WAC would have taken effect, UIW opted to remain in the SLC. The WAC removed UIW from its men's soccer schedule, although it never formally announced that move. This rendered the Cardinals independent for the immediate future.

Potential future independents 
Two other schools may be men's soccer independents in the next 2023 season. Full independent Chicago State played the 2022 season as a single-sport Mid-American Conference member. After the season, the MAC shut down its men's soccer league. All four full MAC members with men's soccer teams found homes for that sport, with three joining the Missouri Valley Conference and the other moving to the Big East Conference, but Chicago State has yet to announce a men's soccer home.

Liberty will leave the ASUN Conference for the non-sponsoring Conference USA at the end of the 2022–23 school year, and has yet to announce a new men's soccer home, but may compete in the ASUN only as a men's soccer affiliate.

Women
In addition to full independent Hartford, two schools were independents in the most recent 2022 women's soccer season. The most recent departure from the independent ranks was Hampton University, which joined the Big South Conference, which sponsors women's soccer, in 2018. Hampton has since moved its athletic program to the Colonial Athletic Association. Delaware State will join the Northeast Conference as an affiliate in women's soccer in 2023–24.

Volleyball

Men's (indoor)
Men's volleyball has a truncated divisional structure in which members of both Division I and Division II compete under identical scholarship limits for a single national championship. As of the current 2023 NCAA men's volleyball season, 11 men's volleyball programs are competing as independents. All are D-II members except Queens (NC), which started a transition from D-II to D-I in July 2022. The 2023 season is Queens' last as an independent, as it will join the Midwestern Intercollegiate Volleyball Association.

Four schools left the independent ranks after the 2022 season. Full D-II member Daemen, transitional D-II member D'Youville (currently reclassifying from Division III), Fairleigh Dickinson, and LIU started competition in the Northeast Conference, full-time home to Fairleigh Dickinson and LIU, in the 2023 season.

Full D-II member Missouri S&T started men's volleyball play in the 2023 season; it has yet to announce an affiliation in that sport.

Women's (beach)
Beach volleyball, currently a women-only sport at the NCAA level, holds a single national championship open to members of all three NCAA divisions. As of the 2023 season (2022–23 school year), the following programs are expected to compete as independents.

Sports with no independents other than full independents
Full independents Hartford and Chicago State are the only schools that are independents in the following sports: baseball (Hartford only), men's and women's basketball, men's and women's cross country, men's and women's golf (Chicago State only), men's lacrosse (Hartford only), softball (Hartford only), and women's (indoor) volleyball.

Football Championship Subdivision

As of the 2023 season, one school plays as an FCS independent.

Women's ice hockey
No women's ice hockey teams have played as independents at the National Collegiate level, the de facto equivalent to Division I in that sport, since the 2018–19 season. In that season, five schools—Franklin Pierce, Post, Sacred Heart, Saint Anselm, and Saint Michael's—competed as independents, all participating in the nascent New England Women's Hockey Alliance (NEWHA), which had originally been established in 2017 as a scheduling alliance among all of the then-current National Collegiate independents. The NEWHA initially included six schools, but Holy Cross left after the inaugural 2017–18 NEWHA season to join Hockey East. The NEWHA officially organized as a conference in advance of the 2018–19 season, but was not officially recognized by the NCAA as a Division I league until the 2019–20 season, by which time the newly launched LIU program had joined to return the conference membership to six.

The most recent school to add women's ice hockey, as well as the next two to do so, have confirmed conference homes. Stonehill started varsity play in the 2022–23 season as the newest playing member of the NEWHA. Assumption joined the NEWHA for administrative purposes alongside Stonehill, but will not start NEWHA play until it launches its new team in 2023–24. Robert Morris, which had dropped the sport after the 2020–21 season due to COVID-19 impacts, will resume play in 2023–24, returning to its previous conference of College Hockey America.

Men's swimming & diving
No men's swimming & diving programs are independents in the 2022–23 season. The University of Illinois Chicago (UIC), which left the Horizon League for the non-sponsoring Missouri Valley Conference (MVC), joined all of the other MVC men's swimming & diving programs in the Mid-American Conference. Queens University of Charlotte moved from NCAA Division II to the ASUN Conference, which also does not sponsor that sport. However, the ASUN is a member of the partnership that created the Coastal Collegiate Sports Association, a league originally established solely for swimming & diving whose scope later expanded to include beach volleyball. Queens accordingly joined that conference.

The two full independents, Chicago State University and the University of Hartford, do not sponsor swimming & diving for either sex.

Women's swimming & diving
As in the case of men's swimming & diving, no women's programs in that sport are competing as independents in 2022–23. Three programs left conferences that sponsored women's swimming & diving for the non-sponsoring Sun Belt Conference (SBC) in July 2022, but all found conference homes for 2022–23. Before leaving the Colonial Athletic Association for the SBC, James Madison University was also a member of the Eastern College Athletic Conference for that sport; its ECAC team title in 2021–22 was its fifth straight. With the ECAC being a separate legal entity from the CAA (or any other NCAA conference), it can be presumed that JMU will remain an ECAC member for 2022–23. Marshall University, which left Conference USA (C-USA), joined the Missouri Valley Conference as an associate member for the 2022–23 season. Old Dominion University joined the Coastal Collegiate Sports Association, already home to its men's swimming & diving program.

All three of the above programs will move that sport to the SBC once that conference adds women's swimming & diving in 2023–24.

See also
 NCAA Division II independent schools
 NCAA Division III independent schools

References

Independent